The Bermudian cricket team toured Kenya during the 2006–07 season. The tour began on 5 November 2006 and lasted until 14 November 2006. The tour began with a drawn Intercontinental Cup match, followed by a 3 ODI series which was won comprehensively by Kenya 3–0. It was a must win for both teams, as the World Cup was only four months away, and this series would give the selectors an opportunity to figure out the squad to send to the World Cup. Kenya left with a good indication as to what their team was, but Bermuda left with many more questions than answers.

Squads

Intercontinental Cup

No play was possible on the third or fourth day of the test due to heavy rainfall: match is drawn.

ODI series

1st ODI

2nd ODI

3rd ODI

Statistics

References

2006 in cricket
2007 in cricket
2007 in Kenyan cricket
International cricket competitions in 2006–07
International cricket tours of Kenya
Kenyan cricket seasons from 2000–01
Sport in Nairobi
Sport in Mombasa
2006 in Kenyan cricket